Dusty Drake is the self-titled debut studio album by American country music artist Dusty Drake. It is also his only studio album, having been released in 2003 via Warner Records Nashville. "And Then", "One Last Time", and "Smaller Pieces" were all released as singles.

Content
The album contains three singles: "And Then", "One Last Time", and "Smaller Pieces". All three made the Billboard Hot Country Songs charts between 2002 and 2003, with "One Last Time" reaching number 26 in early 2003. "One Last Time" is a memorial to the passengers on the planes of 9/11.

Critical reception

Ray Waddell reviewed the album favorably in Billboard, praising Drake's songwriting and the variety of tempos in the music. He also compared Drake's voice favorably to that of John Anderson. Writing for AllMusic, Stephen Thomas Erlewine also described Drake as having "songwriting smarts", noting influences of both traditional country music and arena rock. He concluded his review by saying that "A taste for sentiment and silliness may keep this from being continually engaging, but at its best, Dusty Drake is tuneful, rocking, memorable modern country, beating Toby Keith at his own game", rating the album four out of five stars. Country Standard Time writer Stuart Munro was mixed, praising the lyrics of "Smaller Pieces" and "The Wish" while criticizing the same of "Too Wet to Plow" and "Ain't Nobody's Business". He described Drake's singing as "emotive" on "One Last Time", but added that the production "opts for a bombastic Southern rock or arena country sound...And Drake seems prone to mistake passion for singing at full throttle".

Track listing

Personnel

J. T. Corenflos – electric guitar
Billy Crain – electric guitar, acoustic guitar, percussion
Melodie Crittenden – background vocals
Ray "Chip" Davis – background vocals
Dusty Drake – lead vocals, background vocals
Dan Dugmore – steel guitar
Stuart Duncan – fiddle
Buddy Emmons – steel guitar
Owen Hale – drums
Camille Harrison – background vocals
Aubrey Haynie – fiddle
Gregory Hicks – background vocals
Wes Hightower – background vocals
Jim Hoke – penny whistle
Troy Johnson – background vocals
John Mock – penny whistle
Greg Morrow – drums
Gordon Mote – keyboards
Steve Nathan – piano, Hammond B-3 organ, synthesizer, Wurlitzer
Alison Prestwood – bass guitar
Michael Rhodes – bass guitar
Tom Roady – percussion
Scotty Sanders – steel guitar
Russell Terrell – background vocals
Biff Watson – acoustic guitar
Glenn Worf – bass guitar
Paul Worley – acoustic guitar
Jonathan Yudkin – fiddle, violin, viola, cello

Chart performance

References

2003 debut albums
Dusty Drake albums
Warner Records albums
Albums produced by Paul Worley